Hasan Orbay (born 14 August 1979) is a Turkish archer.

Orbay competed at the 2000 and 2004 Summer Olympics in men's individual archery. In 2004 he was defeated in the first round of elimination, placed 33rd overall.

References

1979 births
Living people
Turkish male archers
Archers at the 2000 Summer Olympics
Archers at the 2004 Summer Olympics
Olympic archers of Turkey
21st-century Turkish people